Claflin may refer to:

People 
Claflin family
Mamie Claflin (1867–1929), American temperance and suffrage leader
Tennessee Celeste Claflin (1844–1923), American suffragist
Victoria California Claflin, birth name of Victoria Woodhull, American suffragist

Other uses 
Claflin, Kansas, a small city in the United States
Claflin University, Orangeburg, South Carolina